Charles-Simon Pradier (1786 – 21 July 1847) was a Swiss engraver who also worked in France and Brazil. He was recognized as one of the leading engravers of his day. He collaborated with Jean Auguste Dominique Ingres on several works.

Life

Charles-Simon Pradier came from a family of refugees from Languedoc.
He was born in Geneva in 1786.
His brother was the sculptor Jean-Jacques Pradier (1790-1852), better known as James Pradier.
He was a pupil of Auguste Gaspard Louis Desnoyers, who was in turn a pupil of Pierre Alexandre Tardieu (1756-1844).
He was to become one of the most distinguished engravers of his day.
He became a member of the Drawing Committee of the Société des Arts in 1812, but was not active in it since he usually lived in Geneva.

Pradier was a member of the Missão Artística Francesa organized by Joachim Lebreton which brought a number of artists to Brazil, arriving on 25 March 1816.
These included the painters Jean-Baptiste Debret (1768-1848) and Nicolas-Antoine Taunay (1755-1830), the sculptor Auguste Marie Taunay (1768-1824), the brothers Marc Ferrez (1788-1850) and Zepherin Ferrez (1797-1851) and the architect Grandjean de Montigny (1776-1850).
They were to form the nucleus of a royal art academy in Brazil.
Pradier left Brazil in 1818 and returned to Paris. He claimed that in Brazil there was no appropriate paper for printing his works.

In 1825 Jean-Auguste-Dominique Ingres gave Pradier permission to make a print of his painting of Virgil reading the Aeneid to the Emperor Augustus. 
Ingres introduced changes, and made a drawing in 1830 that seems to have been the version copied by Pradier.
Pradier won the cross of the Legion of Honour for this engraving.
Later Ingres created a smaller version of his Antiochus and Stratonice for engraving by Pradier, but the project was eventually abandoned.

Pradier returned to Geneva in 1847 in failing health. He died nearby at Mornex on 21 July 1847.
Pradier's last work was Jesus giving the keys to Saint Peter, after a painting by Ingres, on which he worked for seven years.
The engraving was exhibited in Geneva in August 1847.

Works

References

Citations

Sources

1786 births
1847 deaths
Engravers from the Republic of Geneva